Egge is a former municipality in what was Nord-Trøndelag county, Norway. The   municipality existed from 1869 until 1964.  It included the land just north of the town of Steinkjer in what is now the municipality of Steinkjer in Trøndelag county.  The small municipality was south of the lake Snåsavatnet, west of the lake Fossemvatnet, and east of Beitstad. The main church for the municipality was Egge Church, just north of the town of Steinkjer.

History
The parish of Egge was established as a municipality on 1 January 1869 when it was separated from the large municipality of Stod.  Initially, Egge had a population of 941. In 1948, a small part of Egge (population: 70) was transferred to the neighboring town of Steinkjer.  

During the 1960s, there were many municipal mergers across Norway due to the work of the Schei Committee.  On 1 January 1964, a large merger took place: the neighboring municipalities of Beitstad (population: 2,563), Egge (population: 3,476), Kvam (population: 1,245), Ogndal (population: 2,678), Sparbu (population: 4,027), and Stod (population: 1,268) were all merged with the town of Steinkjer (population: 4,325) to form the new municipality of Steinkjer.

Name
The municipality (originally the parish) is named after the old Egge farm since the first Egge Church was built there. The name is the dative case of the word  which means "edge" (as in the edge of a knife), likely representing the fact that the old Egge farm is located on long soil ridge.

Government
During its existence, this municipality was governed by a municipal council of elected representatives, which in turn elected a mayor.

Municipal council
The municipal council  of Egge was made up of representatives that were elected to four year terms.  The party breakdown of the final municipal council was as follows:

Mayors
The mayors of Egge:

 1869–1885: Ole Anton Qvam (V)
 1886-1886: Peter Østby 
 1887–1889: Casper Lian 
 1890–1893: Martinus Utheim (V)
 1894–1895: Ole Anton Qvam (V)
 1896–1897: Jakob Gram (H)
 1898–1905: Peder T. Dyrstad (V)
 1906–1919: Paul Saur (V)
 1920–1922: Nils Taraldsen (RF)
 1923–1925: Trygve Taraldsen (RF)
 1926–1931: Johan Nordgård (Ap)
 1932–1934: John Næsvold (Ap)
 1935–1937: Johan Nordgård (Ap)
 1938–1941: Henry Haagensli (Ap)
 1941–1945: Tormod Saur (NS)
 1945-1945: Henry Haagensli (Ap)
 1946–1963: Karl Dahl (Ap)

See also
List of former municipalities of Norway

References

Steinkjer
Former municipalities of Norway
1869 establishments in Norway
1964 disestablishments in Norway